Alberto Hauss (born Ingo Hauss in 1962; also known as Bela Lagonda) is a German composer and producer. He has worked on projects with artists such as Oliver Cheatham, Beats 4 You, Chocolate, U96, F.R.E.U.D, Boytronic, ATC and Culture Beat. Hauss has also remixed songs for Aretha Franklin, Sting, and Diana Ross.

Currently, Hauss is working on the Terra Del Sol compilations.

See also
U96
Boytronic

External links
Homepage
Tantajo Records

1962 births
Living people
German songwriters
German keyboardists